Olaüs Thérien (September 3, 1860 – December 31, 1929) was a Canadian lawyer, editor and political figure in Quebec, Canada. He represented Montcalm in the House of Commons of Canada from 1887 to 1891 as a Conservative member.

He was born in Ste-Anne-des-Plaines, Canada East, the son of Pierre Thérien and Claire Derouin, and was educated at the Petit Séminaire de Saint-Thérèse and Université Laval. He was called to the Quebec bar in 1885. Thérien was defeated when he ran for reelection in 1891.

References 

The Canadian parliamentary companion, 1889 AJ Gemmill

1860 births
1929 deaths
Members of the House of Commons of Canada from Quebec
Conservative Party of Canada (1867–1942) MPs